Jürgen Melzer and Franko Škugor defeated Matwé Middelkoop and Frederik Nielsen in the final, 6–4, 7–6(8–6), to win the doubles tennis title at the 2019 Grand Prix Hassan II. They won their first title as a team, having never played together in a prior tournament. It marked Melzer's 15th individual doubles title and Škugor's fourth.

Nikola Mektić and Alexander Peya were the defending champions, but they did not return to compete.

Seeds

Draw

Draw

References

External Links
Main Draw

2019 Grand Prix Hassan II